Sehonghong Airport  is an airport serving the community council of Sehonghong, Lesotho.

See also
Transport in Lesotho
List of airports in Lesotho

References

External links
 Sehonghong Airport
 OurAirports - Sehonghong
 OpenStreetMap - Sehonghong
 Google Earth

Airports in Lesotho